Somali Salvation Democratic Front (SSDF), initially known as the Democratic Front for Salvation of Somalia, was a political and paramilitary umbrella organization in Somalia. Founded in 1978 by several army officers, it was the first of several opposition groups dedicated to ousting the authoritarian regime of Mohamed Siad Barre. With its power base mainly in the Majeerteen clan, SSDF representatives, along with local elders, intellectuals and business people, were instrumental in the establishment in 1998 of the autonomous Puntland state in northeastern Somalia.

Early history
On October 15, 1969, while paying a visit to the northern town of Las Anod, Somalia's then President Abdirashid Ali Shermarke was shot dead by a policeman in his security team. His assassination was quickly followed by a military coup d'état on October 21, 1969 (the day after his funeral), in which the Somali Army and police force seized power without encountering armed opposition — essentially a bloodless takeover. The putsch was spearheaded by Major General Mohamed Siad Barre, who at the time commanded the army. For refusing to support Barre's seizure of power, numerous political figures were imprisoned. Among these was Abdullahi Yusuf Ahmed, Somalia's former military attaché to Moscow, who was imprisoned for several years by the new military regime.

In 1978, together with a group of officials mainly from his own Majeerteen (Darod) clan, Ahmed participated in a failed attempt to overthrow Barre's dictatorial administration. Most of the people who had helped plot the coup were summarily executed, but Ahmed and several colonels managed to escape abroad. Later that year, in neighboring Ethiopia, Ahmed formed a guerrilla movement called the Somali Salvation Front, which was subsequently renamed the Somali Salvation Democratic Front (SSDF) in 1979. The SSDF was the first of several opposition groups dedicated to ousting Barre's regime by force. The SSDF was originally a multi-clan organisation. The first SSDF chairman was Abdullahi Yusuf Ahmed, from the Majeerteen clan. 

The SSDF formally incorporated in Aden, South Yemen in October 1981 through the merger of three groups, Somali Salvation Front, Somali Workers Party and the Democratic Front for the Liberation of Somalia. An 11-member Central Committee was constituted, of which the SSF leaders held 7 seats. Some former CC members of the Somali Revolutionary Socialist Party were part of the leadership of the new group. A military structure was built up, supported by Ethiopia and Libya.

In the summer of 1982 SSDF forces took part in an 1982 Ethiopian-Somali Border War against Siad Barre. The campaign was called off when the United States initiated emergency military aid to Somalia. However some territory, including two district towns, had come under Ethiopian and SSDF control. The Mengistu regime declared that the territory was part of Ethiopia, something which created problems in the relations between the Ethiopian government and SSDF.  In any case, the action was swiftly repulsed, and according to the U.S. Department of State, resulted in severe reprisals against the Majeerteen clan; the SSDF itself would be implicated in killings of members of Siad's own Marehan clan, in Cel-Habred in the Galgadud region in the early 1980s.

A conflict soon emerged between the former SSF and the more leftist members. The SSF clique wanted to maintain the domination of SSDF of Majeerteen and Darood clans. They made a deal with the Ethiopian government to purge the leftists. In 1984 the Mengistu government jailed many leading SSDF members, such as then colonel Abdullahi Yusuf Ahmed. In 1984, Mohamed Abshir Waldo was installed as provisional SSDF Chairman.

From 1983 onwards many leaders, belonging to the Darood clan, were bought over by Barre. Many SSDF fighters defected to the regime. By 1985 SSDF had ceased most of their military operations against the Siad Barre regime.

In 1986 an SSDF congress was held, which elected Dr. Hassan Ali Mire as chairman. He resigned in 1988, leaving a power vacuum in the organization. Musse Islan was elected leader by the SSDF Central Committee to hold the position until a Congress was convened.

In 1988 the governments of Somalia and Ethiopia made some agreements to cease hostilities. The Ethiopian government started closing SSDF camps, arresting its leaders and seizing weapons. The Ethiopian government also closed the SSDF radio station, Radio Halgan, which had been broadcasting since 1981.

In 1988 SSDF guerrillas started taking control over the western districts of Mudug and the southern areas of Nugaal and Bari regions.

Post-1991
After the fall of the Barre regime, the SSDF (based largely in northeastern Somalia) was divided in two factions. One was led by General Mohamed Abshir Muse (chairman), who at the time was based in Saudi Arabia, and the other was led by Abdullahi Yusuf Ahmed (deputy chairman). The general secretary was Mohamed Abshir Waldo.

A congress was held in August 1994. Former Prime Minister of Somalia, Abdirizak Haji Hussein, was offered the chairmanship of the SSDF by a group of clan leaders, but declined.

Over the next several years, Abdullahi Yusuf Ahmed would emerge as the pre-eminent leader in northeastern Somalia. In 1992, he marshalled forces to successfully expel an Islamist extremist group linked to Al-Itihaad al-Islamiya that had taken over Bosaso, a prominent port city and the commercial capital of the northeastern part of the country.

Puntland
In 1998, a homegrown constitutional conference was held in Garowe over a period of three months. Attended by SSDF representatives, traditional elders (Issims), members of the business community, intellectuals and other civil society members, the autonomous Puntland State of Somalia was subsequently officially established so as to deliver services, offer security, facilitate trade, and interact with both domestic and international partners. Abdullahi Yusuf Ahmed was appointed as the nascent polity's first President.

After serving two terms as President of Puntland, Abdullahi Yusuf Ahmed was elected in 2004 as President of the Transitional Federal Government (TFG), an interim federal administrative body that he had helped establish earlier in the year.

References

Factions in the Somali Civil War
1978 establishments in Somalia
Political parties established in 1978
Political parties disestablished in 2001